

See also 

Timeline of notable computer viruses and worms
Comparison of computer viruses
List of trojan horses

References

Computer worms
Worms